Diāna Marcinkēviča (born 3 August 1992) is a tennis player from Latvia.

Marcinkēviča has won seven singles and 29 doubles titles on the ITF Women's Circuit. On 28 April 2014, she reached her best singles ranking of world No. 196. On 26 May 2014, she peaked at No. 146 in the WTA doubles rankings.

Marcinkēviča recorded her first win on the WTA Tour at the 2019 Baltic Open when she beat Kamilla Rakhimova, in straight sets.

Playing for Latvia Fed Cup team, she has a win–loss record of 23–27.

ITF Circuit finals

Singles: 17 (7 titles, 10 runner–ups)

Doubles: 62 (29 titles, 33 runner–ups)

References

External links

 
 
 

1992 births
Living people
Sportspeople from Riga
Latvian female tennis players